The pulsating xenid (Heteroxenia fuscescens) is a species of soft coral in the family Xeniidae. The species was first described in 1834 by Christian Gottfried Ehrenberg as Xenia fuscescens.

Description
The function of this pulsing is not fully understood. Some hypotheses include creating a current to assist feeding, respiration, and helping to dispose of waste and detritus. It contains zooxanthellae, and draws most of its energy from these symbiotes.

Distribution
These corals live on hard bottoms of lagoons and bays, and slopes with little current, and occurs from the Red Sea to the Indian Ocean.

In the aquarium
This species, along with most other xeniids, are prized in the aquarium hobby for the rhythmic "pumping" of the polyps, and the ease of reproduction.  However they tend to grow like weeds in the right environment and can quickly cover a tank. In some captive environments they may stop pulsing for long periods of time with no other signs of stress and suddenly start pulsing again later on as if there was never a problem.  This may be due to instability in water conditions. Some hobbyists claim that the addition of iodide may help this species but there is only circumstantial evidence to suggest that.

Heteroxenia are very closely related to other xenia species and take an expert eye to identify.  Heteroxenia grow smaller tentacles between the larger tentacles in mature specimen.

References

External links
 Heteroxenia fuscescens, video

Corals described in 1834
Xeniidae
Taxa named by Christian Gottfried Ehrenberg